Bill Holowaty (born Little Falls, New York)  is a retired  head coach who coached the Eastern Connecticut State University Baseball team for 45 years (1967–2012). He is the most successful coach in the history of New England intercollegiate athletics and led Eastern Connecticut State's Baseball team to four Division III College World Series victories.

Coaching career
Holowaty enjoyed a successful coaching career. He took the Baseball team to the postseason 39 out of 45 times, while 14 of those teams advanced to the Division III College World Series. In total, he won 1404 out of 1936 games (72.5%). He has the third most wins by any Division III coach all time and has the thirteenth highest winning percentage by a Division III coach all-time. In 1973, he was assistant coach for the Chatham A's of the Cape Cod Baseball League.

See also
List of college baseball coaches with 1,100 wins

References

Living people
UConn Huskies men's basketball players
Eastern Connecticut State Warriors baseball coaches
Cape Cod Baseball League coaches
Year of birth missing (living people)
National College Baseball Hall of Fame inductees